Brian Faulkhead (9 May 1937 – 22 June 2005) was an  Australian rules footballer who played with South Melbourne in the Victorian Football League (VFL).

Notes

External links 

1937 births
2005 deaths
Australian rules footballers from Victoria (Australia)
Sydney Swans players